The 2015 Indiana Hoosiers football team represented Indiana University Bloomington during the 2015 NCAA Division I FBS football season. The Hoosiers competed in the East Division of the Big Ten Conference and played their home games at Memorial Stadium in Bloomington, Indiana. The team was led by head coach Kevin Wilson, who served in his fifth season. They finished the season 6–7, 2–6 in Big Ten play to finish in fifth place in the East Division. They were invited to the Pinstripe Bowl where they lost to Duke in overtime.

Previous season
The 2014 Indiana Hoosiers football team finished the regular season 4–8, 1–7 in Big Ten play to finish in last place in the Eastern Division. Their highlight win of the season came against #18 Missouri of the Southeastern Conference.

Preseason

Recruits

Schedule
Indiana announced their 2015 football schedule on June 3, 2013. The 2015 schedule consist of 7 home and 5 away games in the regular season. The Hoosiers will host Big Ten foes Iowa, Michigan, Ohio State, and Rutgers and will travel to Maryland, Michigan State, Penn State, and Purdue.

The Hoosiers hosted three of their four non conference games against Florida International (FIU), Southern Illinois and Western Kentucky (WKU). Indiana traveled to Winston-Salem, North Carolina to face the Wake Forest Demon Deacons of the Atlantic Coast Conference on September 26.

Roster

Game summaries

Purdue

Draft picks

References

Indiana
Indiana Hoosiers football seasons
Indiana Hoosiers football